Peepal Tree Press is a publisher based in Leeds, England which publishes Caribbean, Black British, and South Asian fiction, non-fiction, poetry, drama and academic books. It was founded after a paper shortage in Guyana halted production of new books in the region, and was named after the sacred peepal trees transplanted to the Caribbean with Indian indentured labourers, after founder Jeremy Poynting heard a story of workers gathering under the tree to tell stories.

Peepal Tree is a wholly independent company, founded in 1985, and now publishes around 20 books a year. 

Peepal Tree Press has published more than 300 titles, and states a commitment to keeping them in print on their website. The list features new writers and established voices. In 2009 the press launched the Caribbean Modern Classics Series, which restores to print important books from the 1950s and 1960s. Peepal Tree Press is part-funded by Arts Council England and was included in their 2011, 2014 and 2018 National Portfolios (prior to this the company was a Regularly Funded Organisation from 2006).

Peepal Tree Press is recognised also for Inscribe and Young Inscribe, a writer development project which supports emerging writers of African and Asian descent in the UK, which has included writers such as Adam Lowe, Degna Stone, Khadijah Ibrahiim, Seni Seneviratne and Rommi Smith, who has been Writer-in-Residence for the Houses of Parliament, the BBC during the Commonwealth Games, BBC Music Live, the British Council at California State University in Los Angeles, and Keats House.

Peepal Tree Press is a founding core partner in the SI Leeds Literary Prize for unpublished fiction written by Black and Asian women resident in the UK.

The focus of Peepal Tree Press is "on what George Lamming calls the Caribbean nation, wherever it is in the world", though the company is also concerned with Black British writing and South Asian writers of British or Caribbean descent.

The press is based in Leeds in Yorkshire, part of the growing, independent publishing sector outside London. The head office is based at 17 King's Avenue, in Burley, "a rundown, multicultural part of Leeds".

Peepal Tree Press has published, in various forms, such writers as T. S. Eliot Prize-winner Roger Robinson, Booker Prize-winner Bernardine Evaristo, Anthony Kellman, Emmy Award-winner Kwame Dawes, his father Neville Dawes, Aldeburgh Poetry Prize-winner and Forward Poetry Prize-nominee Christian Campbell, Jhalak Prize-winner Jacob Ross, Christine Craig, Opal Palmer Adisa, Angela Barry, Ishion Hutchinson, Dorothea Smartt, Alecia McKenzie, Una Marson, Shivanee Ramlochan, Jack Mapanje, Patience Agbabi, Linton Kwesi Johnson, Daljit Nagra, Grace Nichols, Lemn Sissay, John Agard, Vahni Capildeo, Raymond Antrobus, Keith Jarrett, Rishi Dastidar, Gemma Weekes, Pete Kalu, Maggie Harris, Courttia Newland, Jackie Kay, Jan Shinebourne, and Kamau Brathwaite.

In November 2017, Peepal Tree Press was awarded the Clarissa Luard Award for Independent Publishers, with plans announced to use the £10,000 prize money for a podcast project, New Caribbean Voices (inspired by the BBC World Service's Caribbean Voices radio show).

References

External links
 Official website.
 "AWP Conference: Peepal Tree Press Writer's Panel 5". Dorothea Smartt reads, 4 February 2011, YouTube.

Publishing companies of the United Kingdom
Publishing companies established in 1985
Book publishing companies of the United Kingdom
Companies based in Leeds
1985 establishments in England